is an anime television series produced by Nippon Animation, mainly inspired by a book "Storie del Bosco" of the Italian writer Tony Wolf, and other books of this author. The series was very popular in Europe in the late 1980s and early 1990s, and were shown in many European countries (Bulgaria, Estonia, France, Germany, Greece, Hungary, Italy, SFR Yugoslavia, Spain,  Poland, Russia), America (Canada, Chile, Mexico, ...), and other parts of world like Arab World, Cameroon, Israel and South Korea. They were big success in France, Italy and Japan, but not very famous and was not commercialized in the UK or USA since they were never released in English. The Japanese DVDs were released on July 25, 2003 and the fully remastered Blu-ray discs on July 28, 2017.

Plot
The story is about a young elvish Princess Apricot (アプリコット ひめ) whose mission is to return to her home - Fountain land, occupied by evil forces of a monster called Scorpion (スコーピオン), before the total eclipse of the Sun. If she manages to sit on a throne before the eclipse, she'll release a great power of water that will destroy the occupators. To prevent that from happening, she's been kidnapped by mysterious cloaked man called Hoodman (フードマン), and his, rather clumsy, aides: Jack (ジャック) and Franz (フランツ). Their mission is to keep Princess Apricot away from her home land until the eclipse. In the first episode, she escapes from the villains by sending a message with her trusty mechanical bird, Speak (スピーク). The Princess's urgent call for help is accidentally heard by inhabitants of Bosco Forest: a brave and adventurous Frog (フローク), intelligent and ingenious inventor Tutty (タッティ), and cowardly, but kind and warm-hearted Otter (オッター). They save her from the villains, and the princess becomes a part of Bosco crew. Guys decide to help Apricot finding her way back home, before it's too late. On their way to Fountain land they get into myriad of adventures, where they prove their desire and ability to help and protect those who are in need, and where their own relationships between each other flourish and develop into strong friendship and love.

Characters

Allies

Main characters
 Voiced by Yuko Minaguchi
Apricot is an elvish princess whose mission is to return home to Fountain land before the total eclipse of the Sun. Her parents were killed by a monster called Scorpion who occupied her homeland. Aboard the Bosco ship, she is at first respected as a real princess, but being humble and considerate, she made clear that she doesn't want the others to call her Princess Apricot, but Apri - a short and convenient nickname which they use until the end. She is the one that encourages friends to help others in trouble, even though it delays their progress. Her character adds a softer and feminine side to the rest of the crew. She is always ready to help with chores and duties aboard Bosco and regularly teams up with Frog to solve the problems they encounter. Apricot and Frog's relationship develops in different way then with Tutty and Otter. As the story goes on, romantic elements are combined with emotions of strong connection between each other, from the first contact on the delta plane, to the very end.
 Voiced by Shigeru Nakahara
Frog is a young inhabitant of the Bosco forest. He is the leader of the Bosco crew, even though he denies it. He is good friends with Tutty and Otter. Throughout the episodes, he often fights with Tutty because of the opposite opinions and ideas and Apricot is the one who usually calms them down. He often drives the Bosco ship in dangerous situations and shows his courage and wit whenever it is needed. He gains strong feelings for Apricot.
 Voiced by Hiroya Ishimaru
Tutty is behind every move of Bosco crew. He is the one who invents all machines, such as the jet-pack, hovercraft, and other accessorizing vehicles, even the Bosco ship, which was used as a house before the saving of the princess. He usually fixes something on his table and he even fixed and upgraded Speak so it could communicate with others. He always has the right idea in the right time.
 Voiced by Koichi Yamadera
A bit cowardly and shy, Otter knows how to be very useful in the same time. He is the engineer of the Bosco ship, as he lights the fire and keeps it strong in order for Bosco to travel. He spends most of the time aboard in the loft. He usually solves problems together with Tutty. He's a good cook too.

Minor characters
 Voiced by Hiroko Fukujun
Speak is Apricot's mechanical bird who looks a lot like a toucan, but actually bears resemblance to a parrot because it repeats words spoken to it. Tutty fixes it first time after being hit by lighting, in order to hear Apricot's plea for help, and then for the second time to the point where it could communicate with others instead of repeating words. Speak is very close to Apricot. This character doesn't appear in episodes 4, 5, 6, 7, 11, 14, 15, 16, 20 and 24.
 Voiced by Kôhei Miyauchi
A noble man from Fountain land, Ender appears in episodes 13-21 and 26. He carried the message to Apricot and informed her more about her quest and its utmost importance for the whole planet. He did not get on well with the rest of the crew at the beginning, especially because he could not understand how they called her Apri instead of Apricot, as it showed disrespect towards a royal princess. The tensions diminished as the story moved on, and he helped Frog, Tutty and Otter in many occasions.
 Voiced by Kôhei Miyauchi
Wise owl of the Bosco forest. Appears in the first episode when Otter asks him for help with Speak. Appears later in most of episodes with other characters from forest as a part of a short sequence with a small instructive story that was shown at the end of most episodes before the closing titles.
 Voiced by Naoko Watanabe
Funny rabbit from Bosco forest.
 Voiced by Hiroko Emori
Funny hedgehog from Bosco forest.
 Voiced by Masaharu Satō
Funny crow from the Bosco forest.
 Voiced by Miki Itou
Another rabbit, also from Bosco forest.
 Voiced by Chieko Honda
Racoon from the Bosco forest.
 Voiced by Kumiko Takizawa 
Ornith, Crow's passion, inhabitant of Bosco forest.
 Voiced by Daisuke Gōri
Appears in episode 2, on the Sleepy Giant's mountain.
 Voiced by Asami Mukaidono  
Appears in episodes 3, 4, 23, 25 and 26. She inhabits the valley that Bosco crew reaches on their journey to Fountain land. She is peaceful and lives in amity with the citizens of the valley's village. The kidnapping of the Baby Dragon maddens her and for a brief time she becomes an enemy for the Bosco crew until they save the baby from Hoodman.
 Voiced by Naoko Watanabe 
Appears in episodes 3, 4, 23, 25 and 26. Gets kidnapped by Jack and Franz and serves as Hoodman's bait for Apricot. In the end, she saves the Baby Dragon and returns him to his mother.
 Voiced by Takeshi Aono
Appears in episodes 8 and 9, he is a ruler of the Oasis.
 Voiced by Ritsuo Sawa
Leon's counselor, appears in episodes 8 and 9.
 Voiced by Hiromi Tsuru
Appears in episodes 10, 11 and 25. It lives alone on a mysterious deserted island where Bosco gets shipwrecked. With help from Messenger, Hoodman convinces Unicorn that members of the Bosco crew are devils. After Hoodman uses Unicorn solely for his own malicious agenda and leaves it with its leg jammed inside a rock, Apricot and Frog help it and prove that they are not evil.

Enemies

Main characters
 Voiced by Banjo Ginga
A cloaked man, dressed in black, Hoodman is Scorpion's mercenary. He is Jack's and Franz's boss and the leader of big air ship called after his master - Scorpion. Together with his aides, Hoodman haunts the Bosco ship, which usually twists the episodes' plot. In the beginning we see him as a fierce, strong and scary leader, but as the story moves on he becomes more euphoric, stressed and devastated, mainly because of his incompetent aides and Damia's intervention later in the series.
 Voiced by Sanji Hase
Jack is Hoodman's cat-like servant who always goes as a team with Franz. He looks fierce, which shows to be misleading as the story develops. He often uses various weapons to attack the Bosco ship, such as bombs, catapults, stone throwers and others.
 Voiced by Kenichi Ogata
Franz is Hoodman's dwarf-like servant and bears certain resemblance to Ender. He drives the Scorpion, and likes to eat a lot.

 Voiced by Rihoko Yoshida
Tamia is Scorpion's competent and dangerous second in command. Her first appearance is in episode 15, when she is sent to back up Hoodman and seize the princess after a series of his unsuccessful attempts to do the same. She is a master of disguise and possesses a private army. She generally makes Bosco's progress harder, but from time to time also facilitates it since she gets into fights with Hoodman. Tamia is loyal to Scorpion, as he promised her half of the world after she hands Apricot over to him.
 Voiced by Hiroshi Ōtake
Messenger is a bat and serves as a bearer of Scorpion's messages to Hoodman. He often gives him ideas to help him catch the princess. Appears for the first time in episode 5.
 Voiced by Hidekatsu Shibata
Scorpion is a mysterious monster who gained control of Fountain land. He is a monster who feeds on planets and his intention with the present one is to dry it up so that he and his creatures can slowly eat it. His voice appears for the first time in episode 5, and is seen behind the curtain in episode 13, when Hoodman asks for new ship. He appears in the episode 24 in his real shape.
 Voiced by Seizō Katō
Oja is a big lizard who is the chief of the tribe that captures Apricot in episode 13. He appears in the episode 14 when Hoodman tries to exchange kidnapped Apricot for Frog - as Oja's only motive is to eat. Oja agrees, but eventually friends manage to escape the lizard's castle - leaving the lizards' chieftain with an empty stomach.

Episodes

Music
Background music in Bosco Adventure varies from colorful and cheerful, to moody, nostalgic and sentimental, with typical Japanese sounds. It has variety of cues, for every situation and place which crew visits (Sleeping Giant, Oasis, Ocean...) Several cues repeat throughout the episodes, depending on the situation.
Songs that were released on Bonus Disc as a part of DVD are: Tokimeki wa Forever (ときめきはForever, opening song, sung by Noriko Hidaka), Hareta hi nimo ai wo kudasai (はれたひにもあいをください, closing song, also sung by Noriko Hidaka), Kara Kara Makkura (カラカラまっくら, sung by voice actors that gave voice to Hoodman, Jack and Franz) and Bosco Adventure (ボスコアドベンチャー, sung by voice actors that gave voice to Apricot, Frog, Tutty and Otter).

Releases outside Japan
Arab World, as "سفينة الأصدقاء" (Safenat Al-Asdeqa'a = The Friends’ ship ) was dubbed in the early 90s by Kuwaiti dubbing center called Funoon Centre. It was a huge success and played by the TV channels in CCG ( Kuwait, Oman, UAE, Bahrain, Saudi Arabia and Qatar) 
Bulgaria, as "Приключенията на Боско" (Prikliucheniata na Bosko - The adventures of Bosco) showed from end of may/start of June to December 8 in 1991 on BNT (Kanal 1)
Cameroon, Egypt, France, as "Les aventures du Bosco". In Cameroon on CRTV in 1992, in Egypt on Egyptian Channel 3 in early 1990s, in France on La Cinq in 1990. Note that in Egypt it wasn't dubbed in Arabic, as only the French dub aired on Egyptian Channel 3 in the early 1990s, when there was a partnership between the Egyptian networks and the French network.
Canada, as "La Forêt Magique", in the early 1990s on TVA, a French-language network based in Montreal, PQ.
Estonia, as "Bosco Seiklused", in 1996.
Hungary, as "A Bosco léghajó kalandjai", shown on TV channel Msat and released on VHS by Tower Video with two episodes/volume.
Israel, as "חבורת הצב המעופף" ("Havurat Hatzav Hameofef" – The Flying Turtle Group), shown on the Israeli Channel 1.
Italy, as "La principessa dai capelli blu" (approx. Blue-haired princess), transmitted on Italia 1 in 1988.
Poland, as "Przygody Bosco" on Top Canal in 1991, and Polish-dubbed version on TVN in 1997.
Russia, Latvia, as "Приключения Боско" (Prikljuchenija Bosko). In Russia, only last ten episodes were shown on RTR in 1992. In Latvia, the same Russian-dubbed version was twice aired by KS Video channel in 1993 and 1994 (only episodes 17-26 were shown, with the last one being dropped both times).
South Korea, as "날아라 거북선" on KBS in 1987.
Spain, Mexico, Chile, as "Las aventuras de la nave Bosco"
Thailand, as "บอสโก ป่ามหัศจรรย์" (ฺBosco, the magical forest), shown on 7 Channel in 1991.
Serbia (Yugoslavia), as "Плава принцеза" (Blue princess), shown on TV Novi Sad in 1991. Overall, sixteen episodes were shown, first twelve and the last four.

References

External links
 Official anime website of Nippon Animation 
 

1986 anime television series debuts
Adventure anime and manga
Nippon Animation
Yomiuri Telecasting Corporation original programming